Lérins may refer to:

People
 Caprasius of Lérins (died 430), a hermit who lived in Lérins, Provence
 Vincent of Lérins (died 440s), a Gallic monk and author of early Christian writings
 Antony of Lerins (ca. 468–ca. 520), a Christian saint

Places
 Lérins Abbey, a Cistercian monastery on the island of Saint-Honorat, one of the Lérins Islands, on the French Riviera
 Lérins Islands, a group of four Mediterranean islands off the French Riviera, in Cannes